The Messeturm, or Trade Fair Tower, is a 63-storey,  skyscraper in the Westend-Süd district of Frankfurt, Germany. It is the second tallest building in Frankfurt, the second tallest building in Germany and the third tallest building in the European Union. It was the tallest building in Europe from its completion in 1991 until 1997 when it was surpassed by the Commerzbank Tower, which is also located in Frankfurt.

The Messeturm is located near the Frankfurt Trade Fair grounds. Helmut Jahn designed the Messeturm in a postmodern architectural style. It is regarded as one of the design classics among European skyscrapers. Despite its name, the Messeturm is not used for trade fair exhibitions but as an office building. It is one of the few buildings in Germany with their own postal code (60308), the others being Opernturm, another Frankfurt skyscraper, and the summit station on Zugspitze.

Design 
The Messeturm is similar in design to towers by other architects including the Bank of America Plaza in Atlanta, Georgia and Key Tower (1991) in Cleveland, Ohio. Frankfurters often call it Bleistift ("pencil") due to its shape. The construction of the building's foundation set a world record for the longest continuous concrete pour. Its ground floor area is just , and features a  pyramid at the top.

The tower uses numerous geometric shapes in its design such as the square footprint which is the main shape used throughout the tower. It then rises to a cylindrical shape which finally completes in a pyramid.

There are 900 parking places in a public parking garage and a direct connection to the subway.

In popular culture

 SimCity series
 MesseTurm appears under the name Hogan Wallace and White Insurance as a vanilla stage 8 Euro-Contemporary building set in SimCity 4 (Deluxe or with Rush Hour).
 There is a building that has a similar appearance to the Messeturm in SimCity 3000.

Gallery

Skyscrapers in Frankfurt

See also
 List of tallest buildings in Frankfurt
 List of tallest buildings in Germany
 List of tallest buildings in the European Union
 List of tallest buildings in Europe

References

External links 

 MesseTurm at SKYLINE ATLAS
 MesseTurm at Phorio
 MesseTurm Paper Model

 

Modernist architecture in Germany
Office buildings completed in 1991
Skyscrapers in Frankfurt
1991 establishments in Germany
Helmut Jahn buildings
Skyscraper office buildings in Germany
Art Deco skyscrapers